Bright Osagie Edomwonyi (born 24 July 1994) is a Nigerian professional footballer who plays as a striker for Slovenian PrvaLiga side Koper.

Career
On 9 May 2018, Edomwonyi won the 2017–18 Austrian Cup with Sturm Graz, as his team defeated Red Bull Salzburg 1–0 in the final after extra time.

Honours
Sturm Graz
 Austrian Cup: 2017–18

References

1994 births
Living people
Sportspeople from Benin City
Nigerian footballers
Association football forwards
FC Red Bull Salzburg players
FC Liefering players
FC Wacker Innsbruck (2002) players
TSV Hartberg players
SK Sturm Graz players
Çaykur Rizespor footballers
FK Austria Wien players
Atromitos F.C. players
FC Koper players
Austrian Football Bundesliga players
2. Liga (Austria) players
Süper Lig players
TFF First League players
Super League Greece players
Slovenian PrvaLiga players
Nigerian expatriate footballers
Expatriate footballers in Austria
Expatriate footballers in Turkey
Expatriate footballers in Greece
Expatriate footballers in Slovenia
Nigerian expatriate sportspeople in Austria
Nigerian expatriate sportspeople in Turkey
Nigerian expatriate sportspeople in Greece
Nigerian expatriate sportspeople in Slovenia